Jack Arnfield  (born 22 May 1989) is a British professional boxer who has challenged twice for the British middleweight title.

Professional career

Arnfield vs. Byrne 
Arnfield made his professional debut on 26 October 2007, scoring a first-round stoppage over Lewis Byrne. 

For his next seventeen fights over a span of eight years, Arnfield went undefeated and won mainly four- and six-round points decisions.

Arnfield vs. Renda 
On 14 February 2015, Cello Renda handed Arnfield his first loss, via three-round split decision, as part of the tournament semi-finals of Prizefighter 34: The Middleweights III.

Arnfield vs. Blackwell 
Later in the year, on 14 November, Arnfield fought for his first major regional championship—the British middleweight title—but lost a twelve-round unanimous decision to defending champion Nick Blackwell.

Arnfield vs. Rose 
On 25 March ,2017, Arnfield beat Brian Rose by unanimous decision in their 12 round contest. Rose was ranked #12 by the WBO at the time. The scorecards read 115-113, 115-113, 116-112 in favor of Arnfield.

Arnfield vs. Langford 
On 17 February, 2018, Arnfield fought Tommy Langford for the British middleweight title. Langford won by unanimous decision in their 12 round contest.

Professional boxing record

References

External links

Jack Arnfield - Profile, News Archive & Current Rankings at Box.Live

Middleweight boxers
English male boxers
1989 births
Sportspeople from Blackpool
Living people
Prizefighter contestants